Helina evecta is a fly from the family Muscidae.

Biology
larvae are found in humus soil and moss. Adults are found feeding on Salix and Tussilago in spring.

Distribution
Most of Europe, extending into Asia as far as India. North Africa, and Northern South America.

References

Muscidae
Diptera of Europe
Diptera of South America
Insects described in 1780
Taxa named by Moses Harris